YS Raja Reddy Cricket Stadium is a cricket stadium in Cuddapah, Andhra Pradesh. Stadium is located at Putlampalle 10 km from the heart of Kadapa city and with cost of Rs.8 crores on a 10.50 acre of land with a seating capacity of 15,000 has been completed.

The ground has all facilities to host first-class matches and has an 85-yard boundary.Here Many international matches were held.

YS Raja Reddy-Andhra Cricket Association stadium was initiative of former Chief Minister YS Rajasekhara Reddy and donated Rs.50 lakhs for the stadium. There is also residential academy  of Andhra Cricket Association with various facilities.

References

See also

 cricketarchive
 espncricinfo

Multi-purpose stadiums in India
Cricket grounds in Andhra Pradesh
Kadapa
Sports venues completed in 2011
2011 establishments in Andhra Pradesh
Buildings and structures in Kadapa district